Rodrigo Morales (born 22 March 1994) is an Argentine professional footballer who plays as a midfielder for Universitario de Sucre.

Career
Morales started his career with Gimnasia y Esgrima. After being an unused substitute for Primera B Nacional fixtures with Boca Unidos and Almirante Brown, Morales appeared in his first professional match during a scoreless draw at home to Independiente Rivadavia on 10 June 2012. During the 2013–14 campaign, Morales was loaned to Torneo Argentino B's Monterrico. Back with Gimnasia y Esgrima, on his seventy-first appearance in October 2017, he scored his opening senior goal versus Quilmes.

Career statistics
.

References

External links

1994 births
Living people
Argentine footballers
Argentine expatriate footballers
Place of birth missing (living people)
Association football midfielders
Primera Nacional players
Torneo Argentino B players
Gimnasia y Esgrima de Jujuy footballers
C.D. Jorge Wilstermann players
Universitario de Sucre footballers
Argentine expatriate sportspeople in Bolivia
Expatriate footballers in Bolivia